Deng Biao (born 12 August 1995) is a Chinese footballer currently playing as a central defender for Shaanxi Chang'an Athletic.

Career statistics

Club
.

References

1995 births
Living people
People from Lu'an
Footballers from Anhui
Chinese footballers
Chinese expatriate footballers
Association football defenders
Tercera División players
China League Two players
China League One players
Shanghai Shenhua F.C. players
Atlético Saguntino players
Xinjiang Tianshan Leopard F.C. players
Shaanxi Chang'an Athletic F.C. players
Chinese expatriate sportspeople in Spain
Expatriate footballers in Spain